The ADAC Opel Rallye Cup is a rally series in Germany for Opel Adam rally cars, inaugurated in 2013.

The first title was won by Markus Fahrner. In 2014, the title was won by Swede Emil Bergkvist.

Champions

References

External links
 Official website

Rally racing series
Auto racing series in Germany